Kafr Hawr (also spelled Kafr Hawar or Kafr Hur) is a Syrian village situated  southwest of Damascus. According to the Syria Central Bureau of Statistics, the village had a population of 2,957 in the 2004 census.

The village is built into the side of a hill near Mount Hermon, just north of modern-day Hinah, which was an ancient settlement mentioned by Ptolemy as being called Ina. It sits opposite a village called Beitima across a valley through which flows the River 'Arny.

Korsei el-Debb Roman temple
There is a Roman temple in the area called Korsei el-Debb that is one of a group of Temples of Mount Hermon. Félicien de Saulcy suggested the temple was originally constructed entirely of white marble. A marble block was found featuring a dedication to a goddess called Hierapolis (also identified as Atargatis and Leukothea).

History
In 1838, Eli Smith noted  Kafr Hawr as a predominantly  Sunni Muslim village.

References

Bibliography

External links

Photo of Kafr Hawr on panoramio.com
Kafr Hawr on geographic.org
Kafr Hawr on gomapper.com
كـفـر-حـور  on wikimapia.org

Populated places in Qatana District
Archaeological sites in Rif Dimashq Governorate
Ancient Roman temples
Roman sites in Syria
Tourist attractions in Syria